Aaron Halle-Wolfssohn (1754 or 1756, in probably Halle – 20 March 1835, in Fürth) was a German-Jewish writer, translator, and Biblical commentator. He was a leading writer of the Haskalah.

Biography
He was born in Halle and died in Fürth. After 1807, private professor in Berlin of the Meyerbeer brothers, and Giacomo Meyerbeer in particular. Some letters between Giacomo Meyerbeer and Aron Wolfssohn were published among the Meyerbeer correspondence.

Besides translating much of the Tanakh into German, he published a Hebrew-German primer (Abtalion), commentaries, essays and the play Leichtsinn und Frömmelei (written in 1796).

Bibliography
 Jeremy Dauber (2004), Antonio's Devils: Writers of the Jewish Enlightenment and the Birth of Modern Hebrew and Yiddish Literature. Stanford University Press.  Review of this book

References 
 
 

1754 births
1835 deaths
19th-century Jewish biblical scholars
German biblical scholars
18th-century German Jews
People from the Duchy of Magdeburg
Writers from Halle (Saale)
18th-century Jewish biblical scholars
People of the Haskalah